Keirn is a surname. Notable people with the surname include:

Richard P. Keirn (1924–2000), US Air Force officer
Steve Keirn (born 1951), American wrestler

See also
Keir

Americanized surnames